Barndarrig GAA is a Gaelic Athletic Association club located in Barndarrig, County Wicklow, Ireland. The club is primarily concerned with the game of hurling.

History

Located in the village of Barndarrig, County Wicklow, Barndarrig GAA Club was founded in 1885, making it one of the oldest clubs in Wicklow. The club won its first Wicklow SHC title in 1923. Barndarrig regularly appeared in county finals and have won 12 titles in all, the last of which was claimed in 1988.

Honours

Wicklow Senior Hurling Championship (12): 1923, 1924, 1926, 1943, 1944, 1945, 1948, 1951, 1954, 1955, 1956, 1988
Wicklow Intermediate Hurling Championship (2): 1987, 1994
Wicklow Junior A Hurling Championship (1): 1941
Wicklow Junior A Football Championship (1): 1985

References

Gaelic games clubs in County Wicklow
Hurling clubs in County Wicklow